Alexander Friedrich von Bock, also known as Aleksandr Romanovich Bok (Алексaндр Ромaнович Бок) in Russian; (7 June 1829, Reastvere, Estonia (then part of Russian Empire) - 17 August 1895, Saint Petersburg) was a Baltic German sculptor and art professor.

Biography 
From 1850 to 1857, he studied at the Imperial Academy of Arts, where his primary instructor was Peter Clodt. During his time there, he received several awards. Upon graduating, he was presented with a large gold medal for his bas-relief depicting the crucifixion of Jesus. He was also named an "Artist First-Class". The following year, he was given a stipend to study abroad. From then until 1864, he spent time in Germany, France and Italy.

Upon returning, he was named "Professor of Sculpture", for the figures of Psyche and Cupid that he created while in Rome. Both works were purchased by Tsar Alexander II, and placed in the Hermitage. The following year, he was elected a member of the faculty in the sculpture department at the academy. He taught at the academy, and was a member of its governing council, until his death. 

In 1880, he offered several of his works to the academy's museum, including the cast for a colossal bust of Tsarina Catherine II. He was promoted to "Professor First-Degree" in 1883. His notable students included , Vladimir Beklemishev, Maria Lvovna Dillon, and Leonid Sherwood.

One of his best known works was a bronze figure of Minerva, surrounded by young genii, representing the various arts. Designed for the academy's dome, it was installed there in 1885. It was destroyed in a fire only fifteen years later. The original models were preserved, and it was restored in 2003.

References

Further reading 
 Entry on Bock from the Brockhaus and Efron Encyclopedic Dictionary @ Russian WikiSource
 Fyodor Bulgakov, Наши художники (Our Artists, 1889), reissued in 2002, Букинистика, pp.48-52 (Online)

External links 

Biography of Bock and references @ Art Investment (in Russian)

1829 births
1895 deaths
Russian sculptors
19th-century Estonian male artists
Baltic German people from the Russian Empire
Imperial Academy of Arts alumni